The Caledonia Corvairs were a Canadian junior hockey team based in Caledonia, Ontario, Canada.  They were playing in the Niagara & District Junior C Hockey League.

On May 23, 2012, the Brantford Eagles relocated and became the Junior B Caledonia Corvairs.  The Junior C team went on hiatus to make room for them.

History
Founded in 1961, the Corvairs first played in the Southern Ontario Junior Hockey League.  In 1969, they won the OHA Cup as provincial champions.  In 1972, the team moved to the Western Junior C Hockey League.  That year they won the Clarence Schmalz Cup as OHA Jr. C champions.  In 1973, they were promoted to the Midwestern Junior B Hockey League.  A year later they were moved to the Golden Horseshoe Junior B Hockey League.

1973 Championship Season
Early in the 1972-73 season, the club's first year as a Junior C club, a second year player for the team named Tom Spratt was killed after a game in an automobile accident.  The team had focus after losing their teammate and friend and won first-place finish in the Central Junior C Hockey League with a record of 23 wins, six losses, and three ties.  They entered the playoffs against successful Simcoe Jets squad in the league quarter-finals.  The Corvairs defeating them three-games-to-two.  In the second round, the Corvairs drew the Listowel Cyclones.  The Cyclones started the series strong, winning 3-2 in the first game and 9-2 in the second.  The Corvairs won the next three games (5-2, 3-2, 6-1) to win the semi-final series.  In the finals, the Corvairs met the New Hamburg Hahns.  The Hans took game one 2-1, and the Corvairs won the next two games 4-2 and 3-2 in overtime.  Game four was won by the Hahns 4-3, to force a game five.  The Corvairs won the game (4-2), the series, and the Central league championship.  In the provincial semi-final, the Corvairs drew the Leamington Flyers of the Great Lakes Junior C Hockey League.  The Corvairs won game one 4-3 but lost games two and three (4-2, 3-2) to go down 2-games-to-1.  They won game four 7-2, but then lost the game five 5-2. The Corvairs won games six and seven (5-4, 8-2) to gain entry into the provincial final.  In the final they drew the Lindsay Mercurys who defeated the Gananoque Islanders to make the final.  Caledonia won game one and two by scores of 4-3 and 10-3.  They lost game three 2-1, but won games four and five (2-0, 5-2) to take the series and OHA championship.  In the end they dedicated the victory to Tom Spratt.

The Corvairs were defeated in the 2005-06 playoffs by the Glanbrook Rangers 4-games-to-3 in the preliminary round.

Season-by-season results

Clarence Schmalz Cup Appearances
1973: Caledonia Corvairs defeated Lindsay Muskies 4-games-to-1

External links
Corvairs Homepage

Niagara Junior C Hockey League teams
1961 establishments in Ontario
2012 disestablishments in Ontario
Ice hockey clubs established in 1961
Sports clubs disestablished in 2012
Haldimand County